Peter James Liacouras (April 9, 1931 – May 12, 2016) was an American academic.

Career

Liacouras was the President of Temple University from 1982–2000, and former Dean of the Temple University School of Law (1972–1982).  He was chancellor of Temple since his retirement in 2000.  During his presidency, the University developed into a Carnegie I classification institution, expansion of academic programs globally,  growth in undergraduate enrollment and considerable infrastructure development.

Liacouras' tenure was marked by substantial focus on urban economic and social development. Seeking to capitalize on the University's location in north central Philadelphia, Liacouras sought to market a vision of Temple as the quintessential working class university that would also increasingly appeal to working class suburbanites from the metropolitan Philadelphia area and South Jersey. He employed creative marketing strategies—notably, a marketing campaign with a tagline of "we could have gone anywhere—we chose Temple", and featuring alumnus and Philadelphia native Bill Cosby (later elected to the Temple Board of Trustees).

Temple Town

Liacouras also sought to impart an urban planning vision for Temple University in a concept he called "Temple Town". He invested considerable effort into redeveloping the University's main campus, with the development of on-campus housing at both sides of the campus, planning for new classroom and laboratory facilities to replace antiquated facilities, and the construction of an arena on campus on adjacent land sold to the University by the car dealership that previously occupied the space.

The arena, originally named "The Apollo of Temple" (a pun on the Temple of Apollo, as well as a reference to the Apollo Theater in Harlem), was later renamed the Liacouras Center in his honor. The arena houses the intercollegiate basketball teams of the University and other athletics facilities, but a main focal point for its development was the desire of Liacouras to have academic convocations on-campus.

The planning vision to inculcate local businesses along a stretch of the inner main campus was not successfully achieved until after his tenure. His planning vision failed to convince local planning leaders to move the local regional rail station on the far eastern side of the campus in closer to the campus (away from the low-income housing that one walks by on the way to the campus). The "Temple Town" concept was sometimes criticized as an effort to insulate the University's main campus from the surrounding north central Philadelphia neighborhood, and his efforts to promote an esprit de corps, having painted messages on wood structures covering decrepit infrastructure adjacent to the University's Broad Street gateway were sometimes ridiculed.

His planning vision extended to the development of academic programs globally, with programs now located in London, Rome, Tel Aviv, Ghana, Seoul, and Beijing.

Liacouras' planning also led to the development of a new Temple University Hospital facility on the University's Hospital campus (serving Allied Health Professions, Medicine, Podiatric Medicine, and Dentistry programs), and expansion of the Hospital as a business with satellite locations around the metropolitan Philadelphia area.

Labor relations 

Liacouras' tenure was marked by contentious relationships with the University's dozen labor unions. In an unprecedented move, the faculty union struck twice in the mid-1980s and early 1990s, with an AAUP censure placed against the institution. Other labor unions representing various levels of staff also engaged in strike actions during his tenure.

Intercollegiate athletics 

Liacouras was notable for his strong support of football and basketball. Other sports, like swimming, he  dropped.  He saw this as part of his strongly held beliefs in urban social and economic development, and a vehicle for successful marketing of the University. His hiring of John Chaney as head basketball coach—an outspoken critic of the NCAA and advocate for access to higher education—led to many NCAA Tournament appearances for the Temple men's basketball team, including several appearances in the  "Elite 8" (notably losing to the Duke Blue Devils in 1999).

Liacouras was less successful in intercollegiate football. He was pilloried for making comments about wanting to see Temple's football team in the Sugar Bowl by the mid-1980s.

The main success of the football team came under coach Bruce Arians, whom Liacouras hired from Bear Bryant's staff at the University of Alabama (former coach of the NFL's Arizona Cardinals and Tampa Bay Buccaneers), in the early to mid-1980s. Minor success was had for a year under coach Jerry Berndt (hired from the University of Pennsylvania). After the 1990s, the football team was considered non-competitive, and eventually the University was kicked out of the Big East football conference. Critics assailed Liacouras' for his support of football as embarrassing to the University (for the lack of consistent success on the field, even if some players wound up as successful NFL players) and a drain on University resources that could be invested into academic facilities.

Political activity 

Liacouras was active in local Philadelphia politics, typically supportive of local Democratic Party leaders. His administration frequently included people in executive and staff positions that drew from local and state political circles. However, he did not enjoy a good relationship with the district city councilman that represented the Temple main campus area, John F. Street (later elected Mayor of Philadelphia), and Street held up development of the arena until concessions were made for local business incubation. Liacouras unsuccessfully ran for the Democratic nomination for the US Senate in 1980.

He was succeeded in 2000 by David Adamany, the former President of Wayne State University. Liacouras is a member of the Academy of Athens.

References

External links
 
 Temple University Law
 Multimedia Profile by The Temple News

|-

1931 births
2016 deaths
College of William & Mary alumni
Drexel University alumni
Presidents of Temple University
University of Pennsylvania Law School alumni